Matthew Alan Kranchick (born December 13, 1979 in Carlisle, Pennsylvania) is a former American football tight end. He was drafted by the Pittsburgh Steelers in the 2004 NFL Draft. He played college football at He played college football at the University of Mississippi.

High school 
Kranchick played quarterback, wide receiver and defensive end at Trinity High School in Camp Hill, Pennsylvania, and at Mercersburg Academy in Mercersburg, Pennsylvania.

College career 
Kranchick played collegiately at Penn State University, where he earned a Bachelor of Science in business administration in 2002. During his two years at Penn State, Kranchick caught 24 passes for 352 receiving yards and 1 touchdown.

Professional Career

Pittsburgh Steelers 
Kranchick was selected 194th overall by the Pittsburgh Steelers in the 2004 NFL Draft.

Kranchick played in 2 games during the 2004 NFL season, but did not record any stats.

During the 2005 NFL season, Krachick played 4 games for the Steelers, catching 1 pass for 6 yards before being released by the team.

New York Giants 
The New York Giants signed Kranchick on December 20, 2005. He played in 2 games recording no stats. Kranchick was released on June 8, 2006.

Tampa Bay Buccaneers 
Kranchick signed with the Tampa Bay Buccaneers on June 29, 2006. He was released on August 29, 2006.

New England Patriots 
The New England Patriots signed Kranchick to their Practice Squad on December 15, 2006. He was released on August 12, 2007.

References

1979 births
Living people
People from Carlisle, Pennsylvania
American football tight ends
Players of American football from Pennsylvania
Penn State Nittany Lions football players
Pittsburgh Steelers players
New York Giants players
Tampa Bay Buccaneers players
New England Patriots players